Lawspet is a legislative assembly constituency in the Union territory of Puducherry in India. Lawspet assembly constituency is a part of Puducherry (Lok Sabha constituency). It is currently represented by M. Vaidianathan of the Indian National Congress in the fourteenth legislative assembly.

Members of Legislative Assembly

Election results

2021

See also
 List of constituencies of the Puducherry Legislative Assembly
 Puducherry district

References 

Assembly constituencies of Puducherry